Bílá Voda is a municipality and village in Jeseník District in the Olomouc Region of the Czech Republic. It has about 300 inhabitants.

Etymology
Bílá Voda is named after the eponymous creek in the village. The name literally means "white water".

Geography
Bílá Voda is located at the westernmost point of the Czech Silesia region, on the border with Poland.

Bílá Voda lies in the valley of the Bílá voda Creek, a tributary of the Eastern Neisse. It is situated in the northern part of the Golden Mountains range of the Eastern Sudetes. About two thirds of the municipal territory are covered with forests.

History

A village named Wyssoka was documented in the area in 1267–1271, however, it was later abandoned. The village of Bílá Voda was founded probably by the Schaffgotsch family on its site in around 1532. During the Thirty Years' War, Bílá Voda was desolated. It was inherited by the Kłodzko branch of the Liechtenstein family in 1687.

Jakob Ernst von Liechtenstein-Kastelkorn, the later Bishop of Olomouc, established here a Piarist college in 1723. As a result of the War of the Austrian Succession, in 1742 most of Silesia was separated from the Habsburg monarchy. Although Bílá Voda became the place of signing the protocol on the division of Silesia, it turned into a border village of the Bohemian Kingdom within Austrian Silesia, limited on almost all sides by state borders. The Piarist college was abolished in 1829.

In 1850, Bílá Voda was incorporated directly into the Bohemian Kingdom, and after World War I it became part of the newly established state of Czechoslovakia.

Upon the 1938 Munich Agreement the area was annexed by Nazi Germany and incorporated into the Reichsgau Sudetenland. During World War II, the Germans operated the E200 forced labour subcamp of the Stalag VIII-B/344 prisoner-of-war camp for Allied POWs, and a subcamp of the Gross-Rosen concentration camp for Jewish women in the village. In 1945, following Germany's defeat in the war, the village was restored to Czechoslovakia. After 1945 the German population was expelled according to the Beneš decrees and Potsdam Agreement.

Due to the remote location of the municipality, resettling of Bílá Voda after the war was difficult. From 1951 to 1989 the municipality was used for the internment of nuns from all over the country. Gradually, perhaps the largest ecclesial community in Europe gathered here, numbering up to 450 nuns at a time; gradually about 1,000 nuns lived here. The gradual departure of the nuns after 1989 caused a further decline of the population of Bílá Voda.

Transport
The Czech-Polish road border crossing Bílá Voda / Złoty Stok is located in the municipality.

Sights
The most important historical monuments is the former Piarist college and its Church of the Visitation of Our Lady. The church was originally built in 1602–1604 and baroque rebuilt in 1777.

The knight's residence, which was completed by Jakob Ernst von Liechtenstein-Kastelkorn in the 18th century, houses today  a psychiatric hospital.

References

External links

Villages in Jeseník District
Czech Silesia